Carlo De Risio (Vasto 3 June 1991) is an Italian football player. He plays for  club Monopoli.

Club career
He made his Serie C debut for Benevento on 29 August 2010 in a game against Virtus Lanciano.

On 19 August 2018, he signed a two-year contract with Catanzaro with an option for third year.

On 15 September 2020 he moved to Bari. On 8 January 2022, he was loaned to Pescara.

On 1 September 2022, De Risio signed a two-year contract with Monopoli.

References

External links
 

1991 births
People from Vasto
Footballers from Abruzzo
Living people
Italian footballers
Benevento Calcio players
Celano F.C. Marsica players
U.S. Catanzaro 1929 players
A.S. Martina Franca 1947 players
S.S. Juve Stabia players
Calcio Padova players
U.S. Avellino 1912 players
S.S.C. Bari players
Delfino Pescara 1936 players
S.S. Monopoli 1966 players
Serie B players
Serie C players
Association football midfielders
Sportspeople from the Province of Chieti